Doriopsilla aurea is a species of dorid nudibranch, a colourful sea slug, a shell-less marine gastropod mollusc in the family Dendrodorididae.

Distribution
This species was described from Jervis Bay, New South Wales, Australia.

Description
This nudibranch can grow as large as 20 mm. The mantle can vary in colour from translucent white to deep orange, with a regular pattern of white raised pustules. The rhinophores are pale yellow to orange in colour, and the gills are also yellow to orange.

References

Dendrodorididae
Gastropods described in 1832